Arnott is a surname of Scottish origin. Notable people with the surname include:
Kyle Arnott (born 1974) hockey player
Andy Arnott (born 1973), English former professional football (soccer) player
Archibald Arnott (1772–1855), British Army surgeon
Audrey Arnott (1901–1974), medical illustrator
Bob Arnott (born 1922), Australian Olympic skier
Bruce Arnott (1938-2018), South African sculptor and academic
Caroline Arnott (died 1933), Dame Commander of the Order of the British Empire
Drew Arnott, Canadian musician
Eric John Arnott, (1929-2011), A British ophthalmologist and surgeon 
Geoffrey H. Arnott (1902–1986), Australian chairman of Arnott's Biscuits Holdings
W. Geoffrey Arnott (1930–2010), British classicist
George Arnott Walker-Arnott (1799-1868), U.K. botanist with the standard author abbreviation "Arn."
Halse Rogers Arnott (1879–1961), Australian medical practitioner and chairman of Arnott's Biscuits Holdings
Jake Arnott (born 1961), British novelist
James Fullarton Arnott, Scottish theatre professor
Janet Arnott (born 1956), Canadian curler
Jason Arnott (born 1974), professional ice hockey center
Joanne Arnott (born 1960), Canadian Métis writer
John Arnott (1814–1898), Irish entrepreneur
John Arnott (English footballer) (born 1932), English former professional football (soccer) player
Jonathan Arnott (born 1981), British politician
Kevin Arnott (cricketer) (born 1961), former Zimbabwean cricketer
Kevin Arnott (footballer) (born 1898), English footballer
Marion Arnott, Scottish author
Melville Arnott (1909–1999), British academic
Neil Arnott (1788–1874), Scottish physician
Peter R. Arnott (born 1932), musician, composer, theatre director
Ray Arnott (21st century), Australian rock drummer, singer and songwriter
Robert Arnott (academic) (born 1951), British archaeologist
Robert D. Arnott (born 1954), American entrepreneur, investor, editor, and writer
Simon Arnott (born 1976), former Australian rules footballer
Struther Arnott (1934–2013), Scottish molecular biologist and chemist
Ted Arnott (born 1963), Progressive Conservative member of the Legislative Assembly of Ontario
Walter Arnott (1863–1931), Scottish all-round sportsman
William Arnott (politician) (1832–1907), American farmer and politician
William Arnott (biscuit manufacturer) (1827–1901), Scottish founder of Arnott's Biscuits Holdings

Scottish surnames